Township 10 is a township in Rooks County, Kansas, United States. Zurich is the largest population center in Township 10.

History
Rooks County was established with four townships: Bow Creek, Lowell, Paradise and Stockton. That number increased to seven by 1878 and twenty three in 1925. The twenty three townships were in place until 1971 when the number was reduced to the current twelve townships.

Township 10 was formed from Rooks County townships Logan and Walton in 1971 pursuant to Kansas Statute 80-1110. 80-1110 allowed for the disorganization of townships and assigning those territories to contiguous townships.

Sand Creek originates in Township 10, then flows southeast into the Saline River in Ellis County.

Logan Township
Logan Township was established in 1880 from part of Plainville Township.

Walton Township
Walton Township was created from part of Plainville Township around 1880. The township, named for settler Tom Walton, was a double township until Fairview Township was created in 1925.

References

Townships in Rooks County, Kansas
Townships in Kansas